P. mexicana  may refer to:
 Prunus mexicana, the Mexican plum, a tree species found in the Midwestern and Southeastern United States as well as Northern Mexico
 Psilocybe mexicana, a psychedelic mushroom species
 Purshia mexicana, the Mexican cliffrose, a perennial flowering small tree species native to western-northern Mexico and the southwestern United States

See also
 Mexicana (disambiguation)